Marin Dună (born 2 August 1967) is a former Romanian professional footballer and currently a manager.

Honours

Player 
Național București
Divizia A runner-up: 1995–96, 1996–97
Divizia B: 1991–92
Cupa României runner-up: 1996–97

Steaua București
Romanian Supercup: 1995

External links
 
 

1967 births
Living people
People from Giurgiu County
Romanian footballers
Association football forwards
Liga I players
Segunda División players
FC Progresul București players
FC Steaua București players
CD Logroñés footballers
FC Astra Giurgiu players
CSO Plopeni players
FC Internațional Curtea de Argeș players
Romanian football managers
FC Astra Giurgiu managers
FC Progresul București managers
CS Mioveni managers
AFC Unirea Slobozia managers
CS Gaz Metan Mediaș managers